This is a list of the first minority male lawyer(s) and judge(s) in Georgia. It includes the year in which the men were admitted to practice law (in parentheses). Also included are other distinctions such as the first minority men in their state to graduate from law school or become a political figure.

Firsts in Georgia's history

Lawyers 

 First African American male: Judson Whitlocke Lyons (1884)  
First African American male to practice before the Supreme Court of Georgia: Henry Moses Porter in 1901

State judges 

 First African American male: Austin "A.T." Walden (1911) in 1964  
 First African American male (trial court): Horace Ward (1959) in 1974  
 First African American male (temporary; Supreme Court of Georgia): Clarence Cooper in 1985  
 First African American male (permanent; Supreme Court of Georgia and Chief Justice): Robert Benham (1970) in 1989 and 1995 respectively  
 First Asian American male elected (state court): Alvin "Al" T. Wong (1976) in 1998  
 First Korean American (male) (judicial office): Chung Hun Lee (1983) in 1999  
 First Hispanic American male (state court): Roland Castellanos in 1999  
 First Hispanic American male (trial court): J. Antonio DelCampo in 2002  
 First Jewish American male (Chief Judge; Georgia Court of Appeals): Arnold Shulman 
 First African American male (Chief Judge; Georgia Court of Appeals): John "Jack" H. Ruffin Jr. in 2005  
 First Asian American male (juvenile court): Tony Baker in 2007  
 First Asian American male elected (Cambodian descent) (superior court): Meng H. Lim (1998) in 2014  
 First Hispanic American male (superior court): Dean Carlos Bucci (1997) in 2015  
 First Vietnamese American (male) (municipal court): Ethan Pham in 2018

Federal judges 
First African American male (federal court): Horace Ward (1959) in 1979
First African American male (U.S. District Court of the Middle District of Georgia): Willie Louis Sands (1974) in 1994

Attorney General of Georgia 

 First African American male: Thurbert Baker from 1997-2011

Assistant Solicitor General of Georgia 

 First Iranian American male: Mazi Mazloom (1998)

United States Attorneys 

First African American male (Southern District of Georgia): Ed Tarver (1991) in 2009 
First Asian American male (Korean descent) (Northern District of Georgia): B. J. Pak in 2018

District Attorney 

 First African American male elected: Paul L. Howard, Jr. in 1997

Political office 

 First openly gay male (Korean descent) (elected to the state legislature): Sam Park in 2017

Associations 

 Alvin "Al" T. Wong (1976): First Asian American male to serve as the President of the Council of State Court Judges in Georgia (2021)

Firsts in local history 

 Chevene Bowers King (1952): First African American male lawyer to practice in Southwest Georgia
 Alvin "Al" T. Wong (1976): First Asian American male to be elected as a judge in the Southeastern United States
 Kenneth Dious: First African American male lawyer in Northeast Georgia
 Miguel Dominguez: First Latino American male to work as a prosecutor in the Atlanta Judicial Circuit
 Jared Williams: First African American male to serve as the District Attorney of the Augusta Judicial Circuit (2020) [Burke, Columbia, and Augusta-Richmond Counties, Georgia]
 John "Jack" H. Ruffin Jr.: First African American male admitted to the Augusta Bar Association (1961) and to serve as a Superior Court judge in the Augusta Judicial Circuit (1986) [Columbia and Richmond Counties, Georgia]
 Bill Pledger (c. 1880s): First African American male lawyer in Atlanta, Georgia [DeKalb County and Fulton County, Georgia]
 Clarence Cooper (1967): First African American male Judge of the Atlanta Municipal Court (DeKalb County and Fulton County, Georgia; 1975). He would later become a district court judge.
 Edward L. Baety (1968): First African American male judge of the municipal traffic court in Atlanta, Georgia (DeKalb County and Fulton County, Georgia; 1975)
 Horace J. Johnson Jr. (1982): First African American male lawyer in Newton County, Georgia. He later became the first African American male to serve as a Judge of the Alcovy Judicial Circuit in 2002. [Newton and Walton Counties, Georgia]
 Willie Louis Sands (1974): First African American male judge in Bibb County, Georgia
 Lester B. Johnson III (1979): First African American male to serve as the President of the Savannah Bar Association (1996) [Chatham County, Georgia]
 Jeremy Abernathy: First African American male to serve as a municipal judge for Woodstock, Georgia (2021)
 Aaron Mason: First African American male to serve as a Judge of the Clayton County Superior Court
 Ethan Pham: First Asian American (who is of Vietnamese descent) male judge in Clayton County, Georgia (2018)
 Alvin "Al" T. Wong (1976): First Asian American male elected as a judge in DeKalb County, Georgia (1998)
 Seth Kirschenbaum: First Jewish male to serve as the President of the Atlanta Bar Association, Georgia (2001)
 J. Antonio DelCampo: First Hispanic American male to serve as a Judge of the State Court of DeKalb County in Georgia (2002)
 Mike Jacobs: First openly LGBT judge in DeKalb County, Georgia (2018)
 Horace Ward (c. 1960): First African American male to serve as a Judge of the Civil Court of Fulton County (1974) and Superior Court of Fulton County (1977), Georgia
 Paul L. Howard, Jr.: First African American male elected to serve as the District Attorney of Fulton County, Georgia (1997)
 Robert D. Walker Jr. (1989): First African American male judge in Gwinnett County, Georgia
 Chung Hun Lee (1983): First Korean American male lawyer and judge in Gwinnett County, Georgia
 Deepak "DJ" Jeyaram: First South Asian male judge in Gwinnett County, Georgia (2016)
 Ramon Alvarado: First Latino American and Korean American male judge in Gwinnett County, Georgia (2019)
 Joe Diaz: First Latino American male to serve as a Judge in the Northeastern Judicial District, Georgia (2015) [Hall County, Georgia]
 Meng H. Lim (1998): First Asian American male (Cambodian American) elected as a Judge of the Superior Court of Tallapoosa Circuit (2014) [Haralson County, Georgia]
 Darius Pattillo: First African American male to serve as the District Attorney of Henry County, Alabama (2017)
 Albert Thompson: First African American male lawyer in Columbus, as well as the first African American male jurist in Muscogee County, Georgia
 Dean Carlos Bucci (1997): First Hispanic American male to serve as a Superior Court Judge of the Paulding Judicial Circuit, Georgia (2015)
 Charles Mays: First African American male probate judge in Rockdale County, Georgia
 Robert L. Moore: First African American male to serve as the Assistant District Attorney in Thomasville, Georgia [Thomas County, Georgia]
 Larry Mims: First African American male lawyer and judge in Tift County, Georgia
 Monroe G. Worthy: First African American male to serve as a Justice of the Peace in Upson County, Georgia
 Rodney B. Weaver: First African American male to serve as a Judge of the Whitfield County Magistrate Court (2019)

See also 

 List of first minority male lawyers and judges in the United States

Other topics of interest 

 List of first women lawyers and judges in the United States
 List of first woman lawyers and judges in Georgia

References 

 
Minority, Georgia, first
Minority, Georgia, first
Lists of people from Georgia (U.S. state)
Georgia (U.S. state) law
law